Adolphe Grognier, known under the pseudonym Jean-Baptiste Quélus, (14 January 1813 – 14 December 1883) was a French actor and singer. The son of lawyer   (1777-1832), and Hélène Caylus, he was appointed twice as director of La Monnaie of Brussels, in 1854 and 1856.

Life 
Born in Aurillac, Grognier was first a sailor, then actor. In 1843 he met the young Rachel in Lyon with whom he fell in love and whose acting troupe he joined for a while.

He was then teacher of singing at the Conservatoire royal de Bruxelles where one of his last pupils was his compatriot Emma Calvé.

Grognier died in Brussels at age 70.

Award 
Chevalier of the Ordre de Léopold.

Publications 
 Études dramatiques et oratoires, conseils aux comédiens et aux chanteurs, Brussels, éditions De Dietrie-Thomson, 1858

Sources 
 Souvenir du 22 mai 1881 - Fête organisée en faveur de M. Grognier-Quélus, professeur de déclamation au conservatoire de Bruxelles, Bruxelles, éditions Félix Calewaert-père, 1881
 Journal de Hélène Delpech de Frayssinet, née Grognier, 1897, AD15.

External links 
 Les directeurs du Théâtre de la Monnaie (La Monnaie)

1813 births
1883 deaths
People from Aurillac
French stage actors
French theatre directors
19th-century French singers
Academic staff of the Royal Conservatory of Brussels
Directors of La Monnaie